Baron FitzGerald can refer to:

William Vesey-FitzGerald, 2nd Baron FitzGerald and Vesey (1783–1843), Irish statesman and 1st Baron FitzGerald
John FitzGerald, Baron FitzGerald (1816–1889), British law lord and life peer

Noble titles created in 1882
Noble titles created for UK MPs